Stuart Page Stegner (born January 31, 1937, in Salt Lake City, Utah, died December 14, 2017, in Reno, Nevada) was a novelist, essayist, and historian who wrote extensively about the American West. He was the son of novelist and historian Wallace Stegner.

Career
Stegner received his B.A. in history from Stanford University in 1959, followed by a Ph.D in American literature in 1964. He served as a Professor of American Literature and Director of the creative writing program at the University of California, Santa Cruz from 1965 to 1995  at which time he focused his efforts on writing. He received a National Endowment for the Arts fellowship (1980), a National Endowment for the Humanities fellowship (1981) and a Guggenheim Fellowship (1982). He was married to novelist Lynn Stegner. He lived in Vermont.

Selected writings

Non-fiction
 Escape Into Aesthetics, The Dial Press, c1966, Library of Congress Number 68-22588
 Nabokov's Congeries, The Viking Press, c1968, Library of Congross Catalogue Number 68-22868
 American Places, (with Wallace Stegner and Eliot Porter), E.P.Dutton, c1981, 
 Islands of the West, Sierra Club Books, c1985, 
 Outposts of Eden : a Curmudgeon at Large in the American West, Sierra Club Books, c1989, 
 Grand Canyon: The Great Abyss, Tehabi Books, c1995, 
 Winning the Wild West : the Epic Saga of the American Frontier, 1800-1899, foreword by Larry McMurtry, Tehabi Books, c2002 
 Adios, Amigos : Tales of Sustenance and Purification in the American West, Counterpoint, c2008,

Fiction
 The Edge,  The Dial Press, c1968, Library of Congress Catalog Number 67-25307
 Hawks and Harriers, The Dial Press, c1972, Library of Congress Catalog Number 75-163588
 Sportscar Menopause, Atlantic Little-Brown, c1977,

References

1937 births
2017 deaths
20th-century American novelists
Writers from Salt Lake City
American male novelists
American historians
Stanford University alumni
University of California, Santa Cruz faculty
National Endowment for the Arts Fellows
Writers from Santa Fe, New Mexico
American male essayists
20th-century American essayists
20th-century American male writers
Novelists from Utah